The Personal Attributes Questionnaire (PAQ) is a personality test measuring two scales "instrumentality" and "expressivity", commonly taken to be masculinity and femininity, respectively. It is one of the most commonly used measures of gender identity, second only to the Bem Sex-Role Inventory.

The PAQ was first developed by Janet T. Spence, Robert Helmreich, Joy Stapp in 1975.

The PAQ has 24 bipolar items rated on a 5 point scale (e.g. item 1: "Not at all aggressive" to "Very aggressive"). The items are scored together to yield three scores: instrumentality (masculinity), expressivity (femininity) and androgyny (masculinity-femininity). The third scale is not used much.

References 

Personality tests
Personality tests measuring masculinity-femininity